"Ten Little Indians" is a song recorded by American rock band the Beach Boys. It was first released in October 1962 as the third track on the Beach Boys' debut album, Surfin' Safari.

Background
"Ten Little Indians" was written by Brian Wilson and Gary Usher and is based on the traditional children's rhyme Ten Little Indians. It was recorded by the Beach Boys at Capitol Studios on August 8, 1962.  The instrumental break includes the initial theme in a different key.

Chart positions
Released as a single in November 1962, "Ten little Indians" charted at number 49 on the Billboard chart. The song was mainly successful in America's Midwest, reaching the top 30 in Chicago, Dallas and Pittsburgh, reaching as high as number nine in Minneapolis (KDWB) in a New Year 1963 chart still dominated by "Surfin' Safari". It wasn't as successful in other regions of America but did reach number 21 on Atlantic City/Philadelphia's WIBG. When released in Sweden, it peaked at number six on the national chart.

Personnel
Mike Love – lead, harmony and backing vocals, saxophone
David Marks – harmony and backing vocals; guitar
Brian Wilson – harmony and backing vocals; bass guitar
Carl Wilson – harmony and backing vocals; guitar
Dennis Wilson – harmony and backing vocals; drums

Charts

References

1962 songs
The Beach Boys songs
Songs about Native Americans
Songs written by Gary Usher
Songs written by Brian Wilson
Capitol Records singles
Song recordings produced by Nick Venet
Songs based on children's songs